Thout 1 - Coptic Calenadar - Thout 3

The second day of the Coptic month of Thout, the first month of the Coptic year.  On a common year, this day corresponds to August 30, of the Julian Calendar, and September 12, of the Gregorian Calendar. This day falls in the Coptic season of Akhet, the season of inundation.

Commemorations

Feasts 

 Coptic New Year Period

Saints 
 The Martyrdom of Saint John the Baptist
 The Martyrdom of Saint Dasya the Soldier

References 

Days of the Coptic calendar